Guillermo Jaim Etcheverry (born December 31, 1942) is an Argentine physician, former rector of the Universidad de Buenos Aires (UBA).

Jaim Etcheverry obtained his M.D. in 1965 and his Ph.D. in 1972, both at the School of Medicine of the University of Buenos Aires. Committed since his graduation to teaching and full-time research in the field of Neurobiology, he was  Principal Investigator of the Argentinean National Council of Research (CONICET) until 2012 as well as full professor and director of the Department of Cell Biology and Histology of the School of Medicine of the University of Buenos Aires until 2008. During 1986-1990 he was Dean of that School of Medicine. He carried out postgraduate work in Basel, Switzerland and later on received the John Simon Guggenheim Memorial Foundation Fellowship to work at the Salk Institute, La Jolla, California during 1978. He is Member of the Academy of Medical Sciences of Córdoba, of the National Academy of Education, the National Academy of Sciences of Buenos Aires and of the Argentinean Academy of Arts and Sciences of Communication.

Apart from his many scientific papers and book chapters on his original research, in 1999 he published "La tragedia educativa", an influential book on the state of education that received several awards. He regularly writes on culture and education in major Argentinean newspapers and frequently speaks on these subjects invited by various social organizations. In 2002 he was elected President of the University of Buenos Aires, the major university of the country, for a period of four years. Active in the board and council of foundations devoted to research and education, among them the Pew Latin American Program in its origin, the Fulbright Commission Argentina and the former Antorchas Foundation, he received several distinctions.

He was named “Master of Argentinean Medicine” (2001) and in 2004 he was elected Foreign Honorary Member by the American Academy of Arts and Sciences, US and participated in the Selection Committee of “The Rolex Awards for Enterprise”. Between 2005 and 2011 he chaired the Selection Committee of the Latin American and Caribbean Fellowships awarded by the John Simon Guggenheim Memorial Foundation in New York. He received the Konex Award Konex Award on Science and Technology. He was named Chevalier dans l’Ordre des Palmes Académiques by the French Republic and, between 2006 and 2012, he chaired the Fundación Carolina of Argentina, involved in the educational and scientific cooperation between Spain and Latin America. In 2007 he received the Médaille d’Or from the “Societé d’Encourgament au Progres” in Paris, France; in 2009 he received an Honoris Causa degree from the Universidad de Morón in Argentina; in 2010 the Bicentennial Medal awarded by the City of Buenos Aires and in 2014 the Santa Clara de Asís Prize for his trajectory as well as the Honoris Causa degree of the Universidad Nacional del Noroeste de la Provincia de Buenos Aires (UNNOBA).

External links
 Guillermo Jaim Etcheverry articles 

Argentine neuroscientists
1942 births
Living people
People from Buenos Aires
Rectors of the University of Buenos Aires